Cold-blooded is an informal term for one or more of a group of characteristics that determine an animal's thermophysiology. These include:
 Ectothermy, controlling body temperature through external processes, such as by basking in the sun
 Poikilothermy, the ability of an organism to function over a wide internal temperature range
 Bradymetabolism, the ability to greatly alter metabolic rate in response to need; for example, animals that hibernate

Cold blooded and Coldblooded may also refer to:

Music
 Cold Blooded (Rick James album), 1983
 "Cold Blooded" (song), the title track from the album
 "Coldblooded" (James Brown song), a 1974 funk song
 Coldblooded (album), a 1974 funk album by The Bar-Kays
 "Cold Blooded", a song by Damageplan from the 2004 album New Found Power
 Cold Blooded (EP), a 2013 EP by Datsik

Films
 Coldblooded (film), a 1995 American dark comedy/thriller
 Cold Blooded (film), a 2012 Canadian crime thriller

Other
 Cold-blooded, a person or act said to be lacking in conscience
 Cold-blood (horse), a horse bred for strength and calmness, such as a draft horse
 "Cold Blooded" (Grimm), an episode of the TV series Grimm

See also
Cold blood (disambiguation)
In Cold Blood (disambiguation)
 Thermoregulation
 Endotherm
 Warm-blooded